There have been a number of Arabic-based pidgins throughout history, including a number of new ones emerging today. 

The major attested historical Arabic pidgins are:
 Maridi Arabic, a pidgin of ca. 1000 CE of the Upper Nile
 Bimbashi Arabic, a colonial-era pidgin of Anglo-Egyptian Sudan
 Turku Arabic, a pidgin of colonial Chad.
 There are still Arabic pidgins in Chad today, but since they have not been described, it is not known if they descend from Turku.
 Romanian Pidgin Arabic, spoken by Romanian oil-field workers in Iraq from the 1970s to the 1990s. 

In the modern era, pidgin Arabic is most notably used by the large number of South Asian migrants to Arab countries. Examples include:
, used by mostly Asian immigrant laborers in the Persian Gulf region (and not necessarily a single language variety)
Jordanian Bengali Pidgin Arabic, used by Bengali immigrants in Jordan
Pidgin Madam, used by Sinhalese domestic workers in Lebanon

Due to the nature of pidgins, this list is likely incomplete. New pidgins are likely to continue to develop and emerge due to language contact in the Arab world.

See also
Arabic-based creole languages
Varieties of Arabic

References

Sources
 Manfredi, Stefano and Mauro Tosco (eds.) 2014. Arabic-based Pidgins and Creoles. Special Issue of the Journal of Pidgin and Creole Languages, 29:2